PS-8 Shikarpur-II is a constituency of the  Provincial Assembly of Sindh.

General elections 2013

General elections 2008

See also
 PS-7 Shikarpur-I
 PS-9 Shikarpur-III

References

External links
 Election commission Pakistan's official website
 Awazoday.com check result
 Official Website of Government of Sindh

Constituencies of Sindh